The National Basketball League was a professional basketball league based in Canada that lasted only one and a half seasons in 1993 and 1994. It rose from the ashes of the World Basketball League which folded after the 1992 season, which had teams in various Canadian and American cities. The NBL's first game was played on May 1, 1993 when the Cape Breton Breakers visited the Halifax Windjammers. The Breakers won the regular season championship with a 30-16 record, but they lost the championship finals to Saskatoon three games to one.

During the 1994 season there were rumours that the Cape Breton team was going to move to Saint John in mid-season, which never happened before the league folded on July 9, 1994. Halifax, which finished last in 1993, was in first place at the time the league had folded.

The league's president was Sam Katz and the commissioner was Tom Nissalke.

NBL Teams

1993
  
Montréal Dragons folded in mid-season on June 10, 1993
Hamilton Skyhawks transferred to Edmonton prior to the start of the playoffs
PLAYOFFS - SEMI-FINALS
Cape Breton defeated Edmonton 2 games to 1; Saskatoon defeated Winnipeg 2 games to 1
FINALS
Saskatoon defeated Cape Breton 3 games to 1

Touring Teams
In 1993, league teams also played games against some touring teams which counted in the league standings.  These teams were:

Atlantic Coast Conference All-Stars (replaced Atlantic 10 All-Stars)
Athletes in Action
Big East All-Stars
Canadian National Team

1994
 
National Basketball League disbanded on July 9, 1994

League Champions

Defunct basketball leagues
Sports leagues established in 1993
Organizations disestablished in 1994
Basketball leagues in Canada
1993 establishments in Canada
1994 disestablishments in Canada